Avenger X is a 1967 film based on the Italian comic series .

Plot
George Lamarro is the head of a pharmaceutical company that is also involved in the production and distribution of illegal narcotics.  When his secretary attempts to blackmail him for a share of the profits and his hand in marriage, he has her killed with her death arranged in a way to implicate a master criminal called "Mister X" who is a master of disguise, efficient killer and professional golf champion.  The real Mister X uses his skills to discover the criminals are involved in a scheme by an unnamed foreign nation using the company and a Scottish and an American criminal to distribute illegal narcotics in the Western World.

Cast
 Pier Paolo Capponi as Mister X
 Gaia Germani as Timmy
 Armando Calvo as George Lamar
 Anna Zinnemann as Dolly
 Umberto Raho as MacDoug
 Renato Baldini as Jack Caruso
 Franco Fantasia as Inspector Roux
 Dante Posani as Jim
 Helga Liné as Gloria

Production
Avenger X was based on the comic series Mister-X as created by writer Cesare Melloncelli and drawing artist Giancarlo Tenenti. The comic was first published by Milan's Edizioni Cervinia in October 1964. Unlike other fumetti neri of the era, Mister-X had very little violent content, with the titular character being a gentleman thief similar to Arsène Lupin. In the film, the titular character Mister X visually differs from the comics design who had a black hood and leotard opposed to the red cape, white boots and hood that covers his face that his comic book counterpart wears.

Parts of the film were shot in Rome including location shooting at the Stadio dei Marmi.

Release
Avenger X was released in Italy in 1967 as Mister X. The English-language title of the film ignores the characters name and is titled Avenger X. Director Piero Vivarelli stated most of the violent scenes in the film were removed from the Italian version of the film to earn a V.M.14 rating.  Censors documents only suggested that 47 seconds of the film were cut in Italy This included scenes where a blowtorch approaches Mister-X's bare chest and a shot of a speedboat moving towards a reef. The film grossed 112 million Italian lire in Italy during its theatrical run. The film was distributed by Euro International.

The film was released in Spain on 22 January 1968 where it sold 707,889 admissions.

See also
 List of films based on comics
 List of Italian films of 1967
 List of Spanish films of 1967

References

Footnotes

Sources

External links
 

1967 films
Spanish crime films
1960s crime films
Films based on Italian comics
Live-action films based on comics
Films shot in Rome
Films directed by Piero Vivarelli
Italian superhero films
1960s superhero films
1960s Italian films
Spanish superhero films